The Colorado Basin is a sedimentary basin located in northeastern Patagonia.

The basin comprises a sedimentary succession dating from the Permian (pre-rift stage) and Early Cretaceous (rift stage) to the Quaternary, representing the passive margin tectonic phase of the basin history. The Mesozoic rifting in the basin resulted from the break-up of Pangea and the formation of the South Atlantic. Long hiatuses exist in the succession.

The basin is of paleontological significance for hosting fossiliferous stratigraphic units dating to the Late Miocene. The Arroyo Chasicó Formation defines the Chasicoan South American land mammal age and contains a rich mammal and other vertebrate fauna. The contemporaneous Cerro Azul Formation has provided fossil rodents, armadillos and opossums. The Middle to Late Miocene Gran Bajo del Gualicho Formation contains vertebrate fossils of the cetacean Preaulophyseter gualichensis. The Río Negro Formation has provided fossils of the glyptodont Plohophorus figuratus. The Permian succession in the basin has provided flora microfossils.

Contrasting with the South Atlantic passive margin basins to the north (Santos Basin in southern Brazil) and south; Golfo San Jorge and Austral Basins, the Colorado Basin does not produce hydrocarbons. Exploration for petroleum started in the 1940 with the drilling of two onshore wells and several onshore and offshore wells have been drilled in the 1960s, 1970s and 1990s. The main source rocks are found in the Permian succession, with reservoir rocks the Colorado Formation. Seals are provided by the Early Paleocene Pedro Luro Formation.

Description 

Cities inside the basin are Bahía Blanca and Carmen de Patagones in Buenos Aires Province and Viedma in Río Negro Province, the earliest founded city in Patagonia. The onshore part of the basin is crossed by the eponymous Colorado and Río Negro rivers. Surrounding the Río Negro, many salt lakes are present in the basin.

Some authors group the basin together with the Claromecó Basin to the north. The offshore part of the Colorado Basin laterally correlates with and gradually ranges into the sub-parallel Salado Basin and the deeper offshore Argentina Basin.

The Colorado Basin is bound to the north by the Ventania High, Sierra de la Ventana, or Sierras Australes, separating the basin from the Claromecó Basin, and to the south by the Rawson, or Río Negro High. In the northwest, the basin grades into the Macachín Basin and the western boundary is formed by the San Rafael Block.

Basin evolution 

The basin started forming in the Middle to Late Jurassic with the break-up of Pangea and the formation of the Southern Atlantic. The main rifting took place in the Early Cretaceous. The pre-rift sequence of the basin comprises the Pennsylvanian Lolén Formation of the Ventana Group, and the Sauce Grande, Piedra Azul, Bonete and Tunas Formations of the Pillahuincó Group, dating to the Permian. During the late Paleozoic, the Colorado Basin was located in the south polar region, causing a sequence of glacial deposits in the basin. These deposits were mostly sourced from the African basin, the Karoo and Kalahari Basins. The Early Permian sediments are characterized by the presence of diamictites. A transgression in the Permian led to the deposition of the Piedra Azul Formation. The succession contains several hiatuses, dating to the Triassic and Early Jurassic, Albian and Paleogene.

The early Mesozoic succession is missing, and the main rifting phase happened in the Barremian and Aptian, around 120 million years ago, represented in the Fortín Formation. The post-rift sag stage dates to the early Late Cretaceous leading to the deposition of the alluvial and fluvial sediments of the Colorado Formation. The drift stage is represented by the Pedro Luro Formation. The later Cenozoic succession is characteristic of a terrestrial passive margin setting and comprises the Paleocene Elvira, Middle Miocene Barranca Final Formation, and the Middle to Late Miocene Gran Bajo de Gualicho Formation. This formation in most of the basin is overlain by the Río Negro Formation. The Late Miocene succession in the westernmost area of the basin is represented by the Arroyo Chasicó and eolian Cerro Azul Formations, cropping out in the northern onshore part of the basin. This sequence is covered by the Late Miocene to Early Pliocene eolian and fluvial Río Negro Formation, outcropping in a thin band along the eponymous river.

Stratigraphy

Paleontological significance 

The Miocene formations cropping out onshore have provided a rich mammal fauna. The Arroyo Chasicó Formation is the defining formation for the Late Miocene Chasicoan South American land mammal age, ranging from 10 to 9 million years ago. The formation contains many mammal species, birds and reptiles. The Cerro Azul Formation contains fossils of the rodents Chasichimys bonaerense, Neocavia pampeana, Reigechimys plesiodon and R. simplex, the armadillos Chasicotatus ameghinoi, and Macrochorobates scalabrinii, and the opossum Zygolestes tatei, among other mammals. The Río Negro Formation has provided fossils of the glyptodont Plohophorus figuratus.

The marine Gran Bajo de Gualicho Formation contains many bivalve, gastropod and echinoid fossils, and the cetacean Preaulophyseter gualichensis. The Eocene succession in boreholes of the basin has provided many species of dinoflagellates, and in the Permian sequence 131 species of spores, algae, funghi and pollen were registered.

Petroleum exploration 
Contrary to other Southern Atlantic marginal basins, as the Golfo San Jorge and Austral Basins to the south, and Santos Basin of Brazil to the north, the Colorado Basin is not producing hydrocarbons. The first wells in the northern onshore part of the basin were drilled in 1946 (Pedro Luro-1) and 1948 (Ombucta-1) by YPF. Another phase of onshore exploration happened in the 1960s, with seven wells drilled by Shell. Offshore drilling started in 1970 by Hunt Oil and after seismic acquisition in the 1970s by YPF, some wells were drilled in 1977 by the same company. Renewed exploration started in the mid-1990s with several wells drilled by Union Texas and Shell. The offshore Cruz del Sur x-1 well provided oil shows of 39° API.

See also 

 Pelotas Basin
 Cañadón Asfalto Basin
 Golfo San Jorge Basin
 Austral Basin

References

Bibliography 
General
 
 
 
 
 
 
 

Geologic maps
 
 

Arroyo Chasicó Formation
 
 
 
 

Cerro Azul Formation
 
 
 
 
 
 

Gran Bajo del Gualicho Formation
 
 

Río Negro Formation
 

Rift basins
Passive margins
Mesozoic rifts and grabens
Sedimentary basins of Argentina
Geology of Buenos Aires Province
Geology of Río Negro Province
Geology of Patagonia
Geology of the Atlantic Ocean